The 2009 Heartland Championship is the 4th provincial rugby union competition in New Zealand since the 2006 reconstruction, involving the 12 amateur rugby unions. The round-robin ran from 29 August to 17 October with 30 games in round one and 18 games in round two for a total of 48 games being played through the round-robin, after which the teams went into the playoffs. In the playoffs, the top four teams from each pool in round two went on to semifinals, and then a grand final for each pool was played on 31 October.

Wanganui won their second consecutive Meads Cup, each coming by defeating Mid Canterbury in the final. Wanganui was a Meads Cup finalist in each of the first four years of the Heartland Championship. North Otago defeated West Coast in the Lochore Cup final. North Otago is the only team to win both the Meads Cup (2007) and the Lochore Cup. This was West Coast's first finals appearance in any provincial championship.

Pool Stage
The 2009 Heartland Championship Pool Stage ran for 8 weeks from 29 August to 17 October. Teams were assigned to Pool A or Pool B, based on their performance in the 2008 season. The Pool Stage was split into two rounds, Round One ran for five weeks with each team playing five games. Round Two ran for over three weeks. The top three teams from each pool qualified for the Meads Cup pool and the bottom three teams from each pool qualified for the Lochore Cup pool. Teams faced the three other teams that they did not play in Round One. Competition points were carried over from Round One to Round Two.

Round one
Round One ran for 5 weeks with every team facing the other teams in their pool once.

Pool A

Pool B

Fixtures
There will be a total of 48 matches throughout the pool stage in the 2009 Heartland Championship, 30 in Round 1 and 18 in Round 2.

Round 1

Round 2

Round 3

Round 4

Round 5

Round two
With the teams split into their respective cup pools, the teams faced each opponent that they did not play in Round One, with the top four teams moving on to the semifinals of their respective groups.

Lochore Cup Pool

 North Otago ranked ahead of King Country and East Coast ranked ahead of Thames Valley based on head-to-head results.

Meads Cup Pool

 Mid Canterbury ranked ahead of Wanganui based on head-to-head results.

Fixtures

Round 6

Round 7

Round 8

Knockout stage

Lochore Cup

Semifinals

Final

Meads Cup

Semifinals

Final

Statistics
So far this season there have been 1559 points scored over 36 games with an average of 43.3 points per game, there have also been 167 tries scored.

North Otago has scored the most points this season with 206 points, they have also, along with Wanganui, have scored the most tries with 29 while Wairarapa Bush have given up the fewest points so far with 84.

Points
The table showing how many points scored by each team (white) and how many points each team was scored against them (grey) in the 2009 Heartland Championship. North Otago have currently scored the most points with 206, while Wairarapa Bush have given up the fewest points with 84.

Tries
The list of how many tries each team has scored in the 2009 Heartland Championship. Wanganui and North Otago have scored the most tries this season with 29, while East Coast and Thames Valley have scored the fewest tries with four each.

See also
 Heartland Championship
 Air New Zealand Cup
 2009 Air New Zealand Cup

References

External links
 Official website
 at Yola.com

2009
3
NZ 2